The Butcher Boy is a 1917 American two-reel silent comedy film written by, directed by, and starring Roscoe "Fatty" Arbuckle and featuring Al St. John, Buster Keaton and Alice Lake. This was the first in Arbuckle's series of films with the Comique Film Corporation, and Keaton's film debut.

Plot 
Fatty, a butcher boy in a country store, is in love with Almondine (Alice Lake), the daughter of the store's general manager Mr. Grouch. Fatty's attempts to get close to her are sidetracked when the store's clerk Alum (Al St. John), a rival for Alice's affections, starts a fight with the rotund butcher. Their confrontation in the store soon involves a customer (Buster Keaton) as well as Grouch. The resulting mayhem includes small bags of flour being hurled and "exploding", pies being tossed, and brooms being wildly swung amid the thick clouds of flour lingering in the air.

Determined to marry Almondine, Fatty disguises himself as a female cousin and follows her to an all-girls boarding school. Unfortunately, Alum has the same idea and masquerades, too, as a female student. After another fight breaks out between Fatty and Alum, Fatty is taken by the school's principal Miss Teachem to a separate room to be punished. Meanwhile, Alum and his accomplices (Keaton and Joe Bordeaux) attempt to kidnap Almondine. Luckily, Fatty's dog Luke distracts the gang while Fatty and Almondine escape. Once outside, the couple see a sign on a tree identifying a nearby parsonage, so they run off arm-in-arm to get married there.

Note that the subtitles in a later release of The Butcher Boy cite new names for the characters: Alum is "Slim Snavely" and Almondine is "Amanda".

Cast
 Roscoe 'Fatty' Arbuckle as Fatty / Saccharine (credited as 'Fatty' Arbuckle)
 Buster Keaton as Buster
 Al St. John as Alum
 Alice Lake as Almondine
 Arthur Earle as The Store Manager
 Joe Bordeaux as Accomplice (credited as Joe Bordeau)
 Luke as The Dog
 Charles Dudley (uncredited)
 Josephine Stevens (uncredited)
 Agnes Neilson as Miss Teachem (uncredited)

Critical response 
A review of The Butcher Boy was published in the April 20, 1917, issue of Variety, a trade magazine for the entertainment industry:

See also
 List of American films of 1917
 Fatty Arbuckle filmography
 Buster Keaton filmography

References

Footnotes

Further reading
"The Butcher Boy" (film review) in Variety Weekly. April 20, 1917.
Corliss, Richard. (2001) That Old Feeling: Fatty and Buster at Time online.

External links

 
 
 
 The Butcher Boy at the International Buster Keaton Society

1917 films
1917 comedy films
1917 short films
American silent short films
Silent American comedy films
American black-and-white films
Cross-dressing in American films
Paramount Pictures short films
Films directed by Roscoe Arbuckle
Films with screenplays by Roscoe Arbuckle
Articles containing video clips
American comedy short films
1910s American films
1910s English-language films